Doomsday Voyage is a 1972 American film.

It was one of the first films available for hire in hotel rooms.

Cast
Joseph Cotten as Captain John Jason
John Gabriel as James Wilson—the assassin
Anne Randall as Catherine Jason
Charles Durning as Robson
Preston Pierce as Second mate
James Edwards as Federal officer
William Bonner as Bosun
Albert Cole as Steward
Edwin Byrd as Politician [Philip Fredericks]
Elaine Aiken as Politician's wife [Mrs. Fredericks]
Curt Matson as Newscaster
Peter Hock as Dock laborer

References

External links

Doomsday Voyage at TCMDB
Doomsday Voyage at Letterbox DVD

1972 films
American thriller films
1970s thriller films
1970s English-language films
1970s American films